M62812 is a drug which acts as a potent and selective antagonist of toll-like receptor 4 (TLR4). In animal studies it blocks TLR4-mediated cytokine release and has antiinflammatory effects, showing efficacy in animal models of arthritis and septic shock.

See also 
 TLR4-IN-C34
 Resatorvid
 VGX-1027

References 

Receptor antagonists
Benzothiazoles
Anilines
Amines